Kjell Johansson (5 October 1946 – 24 October 2011) was a male table tennis player from Sweden.

From 1963 to 1977 he won several medals in singles, doubles, and team events in the European Table Tennis Championships and in the World Table Tennis Championships. He won the 1965 Svenska Dagbladet Gold Medal. He was a native of Eskilstuna.

He also won three English Open titles.

Johansson was called Hammaren, which means "The Hammer" in Swedish, because of his hard forehand. His brother Christer Johansson was also an international table tennis player.

Johansson died in Eksjö on 24 October 2011, aged 65, following a long illness.

See also
 List of table tennis players
 List of World Table Tennis Championships medalists

References

External links
 Obituary

1946 births
2011 deaths
Swedish male table tennis players
People from Eskilstuna
Sportspeople from Södermanland County
20th-century Swedish people
21st-century Swedish people